Assiminea avilai is a species of minute operculate snail, a marine gastropod mollusc or micromollusc in the family Assimineidae.

Description

Distribution

References

External links

Assimineidae
Gastropods described in 2008